The  is the 42nd edition of the Japan Academy Film Prize, an award presented by the Nippon Academy-Sho Association to award excellence in filmmaking. It awarded the best films of 2018 and took place on March 1, 2019 at the Grand Prince Hotel New Takanawa in Tokyo, Japan.

Nominees

Awards

References

External links 
  - 

Japan Academy Film Prize
2018 in Japanese cinema
Japan Academy Film Prize
March 2019 events in Japan